Kvashninskaya is a rural locality (a village) in Verkhovskoye Rural Settlement, Tarnogsky District, Vologda Oblast, Russia. The population was 17 as of 2002.

Geography 
Kvashninskaya is located 30 km west of Tarnogsky Gorodok (the district's administrative centre) by road. Dubrova is the nearest rural locality.

References 

Rural localities in Tarnogsky District